Alawi Hussein Attas (born 1949) is a Yemeni politician. He previously served as Minister of State for Parliament and Shura affairs from 2001 to 2003. He

References 

1949 births
21st-century Yemeni politicians
Government ministers of Yemen
People from Al Hudaydah Governorate
Living people